Until 1 January 2007 Kjellerup municipality was a municipality (Danish, kommune) in Aarhus County on the Jutland peninsula in central Denmark.  The municipality covered an area of 255 km², and had a total population of 13,953 (2005).  Its last mayor was Hans-Jørgen Hørning, a member of the Venstre (Liberal Party) political party. The main town and the site of its municipal council was the town of Kjellerup.

Kjellerup municipality ceased to exist as the result of Kommunalreformen ("The Municipality Reform" of 2007).  It was merged with existing Gjern, Silkeborg and  Them, municipalities to form the new Silkeborg municipality.   This created a municipality with an area of 857 km² and a total population of 84,167 (2005).  The new municipality belongs to Region Midtjylland ("Mid-Jutland Region").

The capital city was Kjellerup.

External links 
 The new Silkeborg municipality's official website (Danish only)

References  
 Municipal statistics: NetBorger Kommunefakta, delivered from KMD aka Kommunedata (Municipal Data)
 Municipal mergers and neighbors: Eniro new municipalities map

Former municipalities of Denmark
Municipality